"Little Caesar" is a song by the American hard rock band Kiss, featured on their 1989 album Hot in the Shade. It is the lone original song that drummer Eric Carr sang lead on during his tenure with Kiss (although he did sing lead on a remake of "Beth" on Kiss's Smashes, Thrashes & Hits album the year before). The song was written by Carr, Gene Simmons and Adam Mitchell.

Background

Carr submitted three songs to Kiss bassist Gene Simmons for selection for the then upcoming album, and according to Carr in 1990:

Simmons actually loved the last song and suggested that Carr should make a complete demo of it. Carr and Kiss guitarist Bruce Kulick went to the studio and completed a full recording. The track was originally titled "Ain't That Peculiar" (a version that is featured on 2001s The Box Set) and featured lyrics from the Marvin Gaye song of the same name until Carr and Simmons wrote a new set of lyrics together using the title "Little Caesar", which is what Simmons called Carr when he was acting like a tough guy.

Live performance

"Little Caesar" was played live once on the first night of the Hot in the Shade Tour, on April 26, 1990, at the Country Club in Reseda.

Reception
In Greg Prato's Allmusic review of Hot in the Shade,  which he gave the album two out of a possible five stars, he stated that "Little Caesar" is one of the album's few bright spots".

Personnel

 Drums, bass and lead vocals: Eric Carr
 Lead and rhythm guitars: Bruce Kulick
 Background vocals: Eric Carr, Bruce Kulick, Gene Simmons and Paul Stanley

References

Kiss (band) songs
1989 songs
Songs written by Eric Carr
Songs written by Gene Simmons
Songs written by Adam Mitchell (songwriter)